Behaving Badly is a 2014 American teen sex comedy film written and directed by Tim Garrick, which is the film adaptation of the 2000 Ric Browde autobiographical novel While I'm Dead Feed the Dog. It stars Nat Wolff and Selena Gomez alongside Mary-Louise Parker, Elisabeth Shue, Heather Graham, Jason Lee, Dylan McDermott and Cary Elwes. The movie was released on video-on-demand on July 1, 2014, before a theatrical release on August 1, 2014.

Teenager Rick Stevens (Nat Wolff), has a crush on Nina Pennington (Selena Gomez). When Rick realizes that Nina broke up with her boyfriend Kevin Carpenter (Austin Stowell) he makes his move. He places a bet with Karlis Malinauskas (Nate Hartley), a mobster's son, that he will have sex with Nina before Arbor Day, leading to a serious chain of events from having sex with his best friend's mom (Elisabeth Shue), to having almost the whole town in jail, including Nina.

Cast
 Nat Wolff as Rick Stevens
 Selena Gomez as Nina Pennington
 Mary-Louise Parker as Lucy Stevens/Saint Lola
 Elisabeth Shue as Pamela Bender
 Dylan McDermott as Jimmy Leach
 Lachlan Buchanan as Billy Bender
 Heather Graham as Anette Stratton-Osborne
 Ashley Rickards as Kristen Stevens
 Jason Lee as Father Krumins 
 Austin Stowell as Kevin Carpenter
 Cary Elwes as Joseph Stevens
 Patrick Warburton as Principal Basil Poole
 Jennifer R. Blake as Janice
 Gary Busey as Chief Howard D. Lansing
 Jason Acuña as Brian Savage
 Rusty Joiner as Keith Bender
 Nate Hartley as Karlis Malinauskas
 Mitch Hewer as Steven Stevens
 Scott Evans as Ronnie Watt
 Gil McKinney as Officer Joe Tackett
 Mindy Robinson as Kristen's Friend

Production
Principal photography took place at John Burroughs Middle School in Los Angeles, California in August 2012. The shoot took twenty days to complete. Originally titled Feed The Dog since it is based on the book While I'm Dead Feed the Dog, the film changed its name in August 2012 to Parental Guidance Suggested before being revised to Behaving Badly. The third title revision was largely due to the Billy Crystal/Bette Midler film Parental Guidance in the 2012 holiday season having already claimed the title, causing possible confusion. Browde, the author of the original autobiographical novel, has disavowed the film as going against the source material of his book.

Release and reception
In April 2014, it was announced Vertical Entertainment had acquired U.S distribution rights to the film. The film was released in the United Kingdom straight to video on June 9, 2014. The film was released in the United States on July 1, 2014, through video on demand, before being released in a limited release on August 1, 2014.

The film received a 0% approval rating with an average rating of 3/10 on Rotten Tomatoes, based on 17 reviews. It holds a score of 18/100 on Metacritic based on 7 reviews, indicating "overwhelming dislike."

References

External links
 
 
 
 
 

2010s sex comedy films
American teen comedy films
American sex comedy films
2010s teen comedy films
Films based on American novels
American independent films
Vertical Entertainment films
Films scored by David Newman
2014 films
2010s English-language films
2014 directorial debut films
2014 comedy films
2010s American films